Chevallier is a lunar impact crater that is located in the northeastern part of the Moon's near side, about a crater diameter east-southeast of the prominent crater Atlas. To the south-southeast of Chevallier is the flooded crater Shuckburgh.

This formation is little more than a disintegrated crater rim protruding upward slightly from a lava-flooded surface. All that survives of this feature is a few arcing sections of low ridges in the surface. The most prominent section of rim is along the northeast where it has merged with a smaller double-crater formation which has also been flooded. The interior floor has been resurfaced by the flows of lava, which are joined to the nearby flooded terrain. In the eastern half of the floor is Chevallier B, a small, partly flooded crater.

Just to the west of the rim of Chevallier is Atlas A, a sharp-rimmed, bowl-shaped crater.

Satellite craters
By convention these features are identified on lunar maps by placing the letter on the side of the crater midpoint that is closest to Chevallier.

See also
List of craters on the Moon

References

 
 
 
 
 
 
 
 
 
 
 
 

Impact craters on the Moon